Biała Góra  (German: Ballenberg) is a village in the administrative district of Gmina Rąbino, within Świdwin County, West Pomeranian Voivodeship, in north-western Poland.

The village has a population of 180.

References

Villages in Świdwin County